The 2017 Gagarin Cup playoffs of the Kontinental Hockey League (KHL) began on February 22, 2017, with the top eight teams from each of the conferences, following the conclusion of the 2016–17 KHL regular season.

Playoff seeds
After the regular season, the standard 16 teams qualified for the playoffs. The Western Conference regular season winners and Continental Cup winners are CSKA Moscow with 137 points. Metallurg Magnitogorsk are the Eastern Conference regular season winners with 124 points.

Draw
The playoffs started on February 22, 2017, with the top eight teams from each of the conferences and ended with the last game of the Gagarin Cup final on April 16, 2017.

Player statistics

Scoring leaders

  
As of 16 Apr 2017

Source: KHL

Leading goaltenders

As of 16 Apr 2017

Source: KHL

References

2016–17 KHL season
Gagarin Cup